is a Japanese modern pentathlete. He competed at the 1968 Summer Olympics.

References

External links
 

1937 births
Living people
Japanese male modern pentathletes
Olympic modern pentathletes of Japan
Modern pentathletes at the 1968 Summer Olympics
People from Nagasaki
20th-century Japanese people
21st-century Japanese people